The 123rd New York State Legislature, consisting of the New York State Senate and the New York State Assembly, met from January 3 to April 6, 1900, during the second year of Theodore Roosevelt's governorship, in Albany.

Background
Under the provisions of the New York Constitution of 1894, 50 Senators and 150 assemblymen were elected in single-seat districts; senators for a two-year term, assemblymen for a one-year term. The senatorial districts were made up of entire counties, except New York County (twelve districts), Kings County (seven districts), Erie County (three districts) and Monroe County (two districts). The Assembly districts were made up of contiguous area, all within the same county.

At this time there were two major political parties: the Republican Party and the Democratic Party.

Elections
The New York state election, 1899, was held on November 7. No statewide elective offices were up for election.

Sessions
The Legislature met for the regular session at the State Capitol in Albany on January 3, 1900, and adjourned on April 6.

S. Frederick Nixon (R) was re-elected Speaker, with 92 votes against 57 for J. Franklin Barnes (D).

State Senate

Districts

Note: In 1897, New York County (the boroughs of Manhattan and Bronx), Kings County (the borough of Brooklyn), Richmond County (the borough of Staten Island) and the Western part of Queens County (the borough of Queens) were consolidated into the present-day City of New York. The Eastern part of Queens County (the non-consolidated part) was separated in 1899 as Nassau County. Parts of the 1st and 2nd Assembly districts of Westchester County were annexed by New York City in 1895, and became part of the Borough of the Bronx in 1898.

Members
The asterisk (*) denotes members of the previous Legislature who continued in office as members of this Legislature.

Note: For brevity, the chairmanships omit the words "...the Committee on (the)..."

Employees
 Clerk: James S. Whipple
 Sergeant-at-Arms: Henry Jacquilard
 Doorkeeper: John E. Gorss
 Stenographer: A. B. Sackett
 Journal Clerk: Lafayette B. Gleason
 Index Clerk: Ernest A. Fay
 Clerk to the Committee on Finance: Girvease A. Matteson

State Assembly

Note: For brevity, the chairmanships omit the words "...the Committee on (the)..."

Assemblymen

Employees
 Clerk: Archie E. Baxter
 Sergeant-at-Arms: Frank W. Johnston
 Doorkeeper: Thomas F. Murphy
 First Assistant Doorkeeper: Charles R. Hotaling
 Second Assistant Doorkeeper: Roswell P. Warren
 Stenographer: Henry C. Lammert
 Assistant Clerk: Ray B. Smith
 Librarian: John R. Yale
 Assistant Doorkeeper: Eugene L. Demers

Notes

Sources
 The New York Red Book by Edgar L. Murlin (James B. Lyon, Albany, 1900; see: senators bios, pg. 59–95; assemblymen's bios, pg. 96–186; senators' portraits, after pg. 64; assemblymen's portraits, after pg. 96)
 Official New York from Cleveland to Hughes by Charles Elliott Fitch (Hurd Publishing Co., New York and Buffalo, 1911, Vol. IV; see pg. 341ff for assemblymen; and 364 for senators)
 The World Almanac and Encyclopedia (1900; pg. 447)
 The World Almanac and Encyclopedia (1900; pg. 448)
 NEW YORK LEGISLATURE in NYT on January 3, 1900
 THE LEGISLATURE MEETS in NYT on January 4, 1900

123
1900 in New York (state)
1900 U.S. legislative sessions